JS Yamagiri (DD-152) is an  in the Japan Maritime Self-Defense Force. (JMSDF)

It is the first major combat vessel in the JMSDF to have a female captain. On February 29, 2016 Miho Otani became the first woman to command a destroyer in active duty the service. She had previously commanded a training destroyer. As of 2016 the vessel had around 10 female crew members with designated accommodation and toilets for them. Otani was captain from February 2016 to February 2017.

References

External links

Asagiri-class destroyers
Ships built by Mitsui Engineering and Shipbuilding
1986 ships

.